Trajan's Market is a large complex of ruins in the city of Rome, Italy, located on the Via dei Fori Imperiali, at the opposite end to the Colosseum.  The surviving buildings and structures, built as an integral part of Trajan's Forum and nestled against the excavated flank of the Quirinal Hill, present a living model of life in the Roman capital and a glimpse at the restoration in the city, which reveals new treasures and insights about ancient Roman architecture.

Thought to be the world's oldest shopping mall, the arcades in Trajan's Market are now believed by many to be administrative offices for Emperor Trajan. The shops and apartments were built in a multi-level structure and it is still possible to visit several of the levels.  Highlights include delicate marble floors and the remains of a library.

Construction
Trajan's Market was probably built in 100–110 AD by Apollodorus of Damascus, an architect who always followed Trajan in his adventures and to whom Trajan entrusted the planning of his Forum. It was inaugurated in 113 AD. During the Middle Ages the complex was transformed by adding floor levels, still visible today, and defensive elements such as the Torre delle Milizie, the "militia tower" built in 1200. A convent, which was built in this area in the 16th century was acquired by the state in 1885 and became the Goffredo Mameli barracks. This was demolished at the beginning of the twentieth century to restore Trajan's Markets to the city of Rome.

Museo dei Fori Imperiali 

The Museum of the Imperial Fora, which opened in 2007, houses a wealth of artifacts from all of ancient Rome's forums.  The modern entrances to Trajan's Market are at Via Quattro Novembre, 94, and Piazza Madonna di Loreto. 
Immediately, the visitor enters into a shopping area, disposed on two different sides, where free wheat was once distributed to the people of Rome.

At the end of this hall, a large balcony offers a view of the markets, Trajan's Forum, and the Vittoriano.  This is actually a part of the Via Biberatica (from the Latin bibo, bibere meaning "to drink"; the street was the location for several of the Roman taverns and grocers' shops in the area). The road cuts through Trajan's Market.

On the lower part there are also two large halls, probably used for auditions or concerts.  A shop housed in the Market is known as a taberna.  The giant exedra formed by the market structure was originally mirrored by a matching exedral boundary space on the south flank of Trajan's Forum.

The grand hall of the market is roofed by a concrete vault raised on piers, both covering and allowing air and light into the central space.  The market itself is constructed primarily out of brick and concrete.

Gallery

See also

References and sources

References

Sources

External links 
 
High-resolution 360° Panoramas and Images of Trajan's Market | Art Atlas

Buildings and structures completed in the 2nd century
Ancient Roman buildings and structures in Rome
Retail buildings in Italy
Ruins in Italy
Museums of Dacia
Roman Dacia
Market
Museums in Rome
Museums of ancient Rome in Italy
Trajan's Forum
Rome R. I Monti